Dolicharthria modestalis is a moth in the family Crambidae. It was described by Saalmüller in 1880. It is found in Madagascar.

References

Moths described in 1880
Spilomelinae
Moths of Madagascar